Jerzy Boniecki (7 February 1933 – 5 March 2021) was a Polish freestyle and backstroke swimmer. He competed in two events at the 1952 Summer Olympics.

References

External links

1933 births
2021 deaths
Polish male backstroke swimmers
Polish male freestyle swimmers
Olympic swimmers of Poland
Swimmers at the 1952 Summer Olympics
Sportspeople from Łódź
20th-century Polish people